Tony Cook is an American politician. He served as a Republican member for the 32nd district of the Indiana House of Representatives.

In 2014, Cook won the election for the 32nd district of the Indiana House of Representatives. He succeeded P. Eric Turner. Cook assumed his office on December 15, 2014. He retired as a politician after his term for the 32nd district in 2022.

References 

Living people
Place of birth missing (living people)
Year of birth missing (living people)
Republican Party members of the Indiana House of Representatives
21st-century American politicians